Shannon Wilson is a Canadian fashion designer, businesswoman, and philanthropist. She is best known for her former role as lead designer at yoga-apparel company Lululemon Athletica, where she designed some of the company’s most successful products – including the groove pants and logo hoodie.  She remains a mentor for the current designers at the company.  Recently, she founded Kit and Ace, a technical luxury apparel company, and was the company's creative director. Wilson created "technical cashmere" for Kit and Ace, which is cashmere blended with varying combinations of spandex, cotton and rayon to make it machine washable.

Early life and education
Wilson received her BFA in Fashion Design from the University of Victoria.

Business 
In the summer of 2014, Wilson and her stepson JJ Wilson founded Kit and Ace, a luxury T-shirt retailer made with a proprietary cashmere blend. The first studio pop-up location opened in Vancouver, British Columbia in July, 2014. She also co-founded the meditation blog, whil.com, with her husband Chip Wilson. In July 2014, the blog’s assets were sold to entrepreneur Joe Burton. Chip and Shannon are the lead investors in the new whil (a full service digital health & wellness platform focused on bringing mindfulness to the world) launching in March 2015. The website launched in 2013.

Philanthropy
In 2007, along with her husband, she established imagine1day, a non-profit organization committed to bringing primary education to 80 percent of children in Ethiopia by 2030. In 2012 the Wilson family donated $1.5 million to the Vancouver Biennale for the specific purpose of gifting “A-maze-ing Laughter” to the City of Vancouver. "A-maze-ing Laughter" is a metal sculpture designed by Yue Minjun and currently sits in Morton Park in Vancouver, British Columbia.

Wilson and her husband are leading sponsors of the annual Child Run. The Child Run is the largest family fun run in Vancouver, with a 5K for runners and walkers on a scenic route through Queen Elizabeth Park and a 1K fun run, followed by a carnival celebration. Proceeds support British Columbia's Children's Hospital and their fight against childhood cancer. This year, 2014, the run had over 6,000 participants and raised over $1 million.

In 2013, Wilson made her first philanthropic endeavor when she and her husband pledged $12 million to launch the Chip and Shannon Wilson School of Design at Kwantlen Polytechnic University (Richmond campus). The school will break ground in Fall 2013 and will include new teaching studios, gallery space for student exhibitions and a “usability lab” where students can design, prototype and market product concepts. The school is scheduled to open in 2015 and is expected to increase the overall number of design students by 57 percent.

Awards and honours
In 2015, Wilson and her husband, Chip Wilson, received an honorary doctorate from Kwantlen Polytechnic University. In 2014, Wilson received an honorary doctorate from the Emily Carr University of Art and Design.

Personal life
Wilson currently resides in Vancouver, British Columbia with her children and husband, Chip Wilson, co-founder of Lululemon.

References

External links
 whil.com
 kitandace.com

Businesspeople from Vancouver
Canadian businesspeople in retailing
Canadian fashion designers
Canadian philanthropists
Canadian women philanthropists
Canadian women in business
Living people
People from North Vancouver
University of Victoria alumni
Year of birth missing (living people)
Canadian women fashion designers
Lululemon Athletica